The WKB approximation is a method for solving equations in applied mathematics.

WKB may also refer to:

Warracknabeal Airport (IATA: WKB), in Warracknabeal, Victoria, Australia
Well-known binary, a language for marking up vector geometry objects on a map

See also